Lazarte is a surname. Notable people with the surname include:

Gabriel Lazarte (born 1997), Argentine footballer 
Luis Alberto Lazarte (born 1971), Argentine boxer 
Silvia Lazarte (1964–2020), Bolivian politician

Spanish-language surnames